Die cutting may refer to:
 Die (manufacturing)
 Die cutting (shearing), the general process of shearing using dies
 Die cutting (web), the cutting of shapes out of webs
 Die preparation of semiconductor chips
 Another name for die making
 Katanuki (Japanese, lit. Die Cutting), a game where one cuts a shape out of a sheet of candy